Dentimargo montrouzieri is a species of sea snail, a marine gastropod mollusk in the family Marginellidae, the margin snails.

Description

Distribution
This marine species occurs off New Caledonia.

References

Marginellidae
Gastropods described in 2003